Ribarci is a village in the municipality of Novaci, North Macedonia.

Demographics
According to the 2002 census, the village had a total of 130 inhabitants. Ethnic groups in the village include:

Macedonians 130

References

Villages in Novaci Municipality